Héctor Vicario Castrejón (born 23 March 1962) is a Mexican politician affiliated with the Institutional Revolutionary Party. As of 2014 he served as Senator of the LVIII and LIX Legislatures of the Mexican Congress representing Guerrero and as Deputy of the LVII Legislature.

References

1963 births
Living people
Politicians from Guerrero
Members of the Senate of the Republic (Mexico)
Members of the Chamber of Deputies (Mexico)
Institutional Revolutionary Party politicians
21st-century Mexican politicians